The Ambassador of Russia to Estonia is the official representative of the President and the Government of the Russian Federation to the President and the Government of Estonia.

The ambassador and his staff work at large in the Russian embassy in Tallinn. There is a consular section in Tartu, and a consulate general in Narva.

History of diplomatic relations

Diplomatic relations between the Republic of Estonia and the Russian Soviet Federative Socialist Republic were established on 2 February 1920, when Bolshevist Russia recognized de jure the independence of the Republic of Estonia, and renounced in perpetuity all rights to the territory of Estonia, via the Treaty of Tartu. Relations were maintained after the establishment of the Soviet Union in 1923, but deteriorated after the signing of the Molotov–Ribbentrop Pact between Germany and the USSR, and its provisions for the domination of the Baltic countries by the Soviet Union. Estonia in the Second World War was at first pressured to accept Soviet military domination, and then occupied by Soviet forces in 1940. A pro-Soviet government was installed, and on 6 August 1940 Estonia was annexed into the Soviet Union as the Estonian Soviet Socialist Republic.

During the late Soviet Glasnost policy of Mikhail Gorbachev, new elections were held, returning a parliament that introduced a resolution for independence on 8 May 1990. Anticipating Estonian independence, Boris Yeltsin, chairman of the Supreme Soviet of the Russian SFSR met with his counterpart, Arnold Rüütel, chairman of the Estonian SSR, in January 1991 to plan for transition. During the 1991 Soviet coup d'état attempt, the Estonian parliament issued a Declaration of Independence from the Soviet Union on 20 August 1991, which was recognized by the State Council of the Soviet Union on 6 September 1991. With the dissolution of the Soviet Union at the end of the year, the Russian Federation emerged as the Soviet Union's legal successor. The first ambassador of the Russian Federation to Estonia, Aleksandr Kuznetsov, was appointed on 24 January 1992.

List of representatives (1920- present)

Representatives of the Russian Soviet Federative Socialist Republic to Estonia (1920-1923)

Representatives of the Soviet Union to Estonia (1923-1940)

Representatives of the Russian Federation to Estonia (1992-present)

References 

 
Estonia
Russia